The 2004 College Football All-America Team is composed of the following All-American Teams: Associated Press (AP), Football Writers Association of America (FWAA), American Football Coaches Association (AFCA), Walter Camp Football Foundation, The Sporting News, Sports Illustrated, Pro Football Weekly, ESPN, CBS Sports, College Football News, and Rivals.com.

The College Football All-America Team is an honor given annually to the best American college football players at their respective positions. The original usage of the term All-America seems to have been to such a list selected by football pioneer Walter Camp in the 1890s. The NCAA officially recognizes All-Americans selected by the AP, AFCA, FWAA, SN, and the WCFF to determine Consensus All-Americans.

Thirteen players were recognized as consensus All-Americans for 2004, 8 of them unanimously. Unanimous selections are followed by an asterisk (*)

Offense

Quarterback
 Matt Leinart, Southern California (AP, AFCA, WCFF, ESPN, Rivals)
 Alex Smith, Utah (FWAA, SN, SI, PFW, CBS, CFN)

Running backs
 Adrian Peterson, Oklahoma (AP, AFCA, FWAA, SN, WCFF, SI, PFW, CBS, CFN, Rivals)
 J.J. Arrington, California (AP, FWAA, SN, SI, ESPN, CBS)
 Cedric Benson, Texas (WCFF, SI, ESPN, CFN, Rivals) 
 Cadillac Williams, Auburn (AFCA)
 DeAngelo Williams, Memphis (PFW)
 Jamario Thomas, North Texas (CBS)

Fullback
 Brian Leonard, Rutgers (PFW)

Wide receivers
 Braylon Edwards, Michigan (AP, AFCA, FWAA, SN, WCFF, SI, PFW, ESPN, CBS, CFN, Rivals)
 Taylor Stubblefield, Purdue (AP, FWAA, SN, WCFF, ESPN, CBS, Rivals)
 Mark Clayton, Oklahoma (AFCA) 
 Roddy White, UAB (PFW)
 Dante Ridgeway, Ball State (CFN)

Tight end
 Heath Miller, Virginia (AP, AFCA, FWAA, SN, WCF, SI, PFW, ESPN, CBS, CFN, Rivals)

Linemen
 Jammal Brown, Oklahoma (AP, AFCA, FWAA, SN, WCFF, SI, PFW, ESPN, CBS, CFN, Rivals)
 Alex Barron, Florida State (AP, AFCA, FWAA, SN, WCFF, ESPN, CBS, CBS, CFN, Rivals)
 Elton Brown, Virginia (AP, AFCA, SN, WCFF, SI, ESPN, CBS, Rivals) 
 Chris Kemoeatu, Utah (FWAA, SI, PFW, CBS, CFN)
 David Baas, Michigan (AP, FWAA, WCFF, CBS) 
 Ben Wilkerson, LSU (AFCA, SN)
 Vince Carter, Oklahoma (FWAA, WCFF, CBS, ESPN) 
 Michael Muñoz, Tennessee (AP, AFCA)
 Greg Eslinger, Minnesota (FWAA) 
 Sam Mayes, Oklahoma State (SN) 
 Marcus McNeill, Auburn (SI, CBS) 
 Marvin Philip, California (SI) 
 Adam Snyder, Oregon (ESPN) 
 D'Brickashaw Ferguson, Virginia (PFW)
 Dan Buenning, Wisconsin (PFW)
 Mark Setterstrom, Minnesota (Rivals) 
 Wesley Britt, Alabama (CFN) 
 Daryn Colledge, Boise State (CFN) 
 Jason Brown, North Carolina (PFW)
 Sam Baker, Southern California (CBS)

Defense

Linemen
 Erasmus James, Wisconsin, (AP, AFCA, FWAA, WCFF, PFW, ESPN, CBS, CFN, Rivals)
 David Pollack, Georgia (AP, AFCA, WCFF, SI, PFW, ESPN, CFN)
 Johnathan Goddard, Marshall (FWAA, CBS, CFN) 
 Shaun Cody, Southern California (AP, FWAA, WCFF, SI, ESPN, CBS)
 Dan Cody, Oklahoma (FWAA) 
 Mathias Kiwanuka, Boston College (AFCA, SN, Rivals) 
 Ryan Riddle, California (SN, SI)
 Marcus Spears, LSU (AP, AFCA, WCFF, CFN)
 Mike Patterson, Southern California (SN, SI, Rivals) 
 Jesse Mahelona, Tennessee (SN) 
 Travis Johnson, Florida State (PFW, ESPN, CBS, Rivals)
 Luis Castillo, Northwestern (PFW)

Linebackers
 Derrick Johnson, Texas (AP, AFCA, FWAA, SN, WCFF, SI, PFW, ESPN, CBS, CFN, Rivals)
 Matt Grootegoed, Southern California (AP, AFCA, WCFF) 
 A. J. Hawk, Ohio State (AP, SN, WCFF, SI, CBS, Rivals)
 Kevin Burnett, Tennessee (AFCA) 
 Michael Boley, Southern Mississippi (FWAA) 
 Lofa Tatupu, Southern California (SI)
 Ahmad Brooks, Virginia (SN, PFW) 
 Channing Crowder, Florida (ESPN)  
 Ernie Sims, Florida State (ESPN) 
 Chad Greenway, Iowa (PFW) 
 Spencer Havner, UCLA (CBS, CFN) 
 Leroy Hill, Clemson (Rivals) 
 D'Qwell Jackson, Maryland (CFN)

Defensive backs
 Carlos Rogers, Auburn (AP, FWAA, WCFF, SI, ESPN, CBS, CFN, Rivals) 
 Antrel Rolle, Miami (FL) (AP, AFCA, FWAA, SN, WCFF, SI, PFW, Rivals)
 Marlin Jackson, Michigan, (AP, AFCA, SN, FWAA, ESPN) 
 Ernest Shazor, Michigan (AP, FWAA, WCFF, SI, ESPN, CBS, CFN, Rivals)
 Thomas Davis, Georgia (AFCA, SN, WCFF, PFW, CFN, Rivals)
 Corey Webster, LSU (AFCA, SN) 
 Junior Rosegreen, Auburn (SI, CBS) 
 Mitch Meeuwsen, Oregon State (ESPN) 
 Eric Green, Virginia Tech (PFW) 
 Jim Leonhard, Wisconsin (PFW) 
 Morgan Scalley, Utah (CBS) 
 Adam "Pacman" Jones, West Virginia (CFN)

Special teams

Kicker
 Mike Nugent, Ohio State (AP, AFCA, FWAA, SN, WCFF, SI, PFW, ESPN, CBS, CFN, Rivals)

Punter
 Brandon Fields, Michigan State (AP, FWAA, WCFF, SI, CBS, CFN) 
 Matt Payne, BYU (AFCA, SN, Rivals)  
 John Torp, Colorado (ESPN)
 Daniel Sepulveda, Baylor (PFW)

Returners
 Reggie Bush, Southern California (AP-All-Purpose, AFCA, FWAA, SN-PR, SI-All-Purpose, ESPN, CBS, CFN, Rivals-Utility) 
 Devin Hester, Miami (FL) (SN-KR, WCFF) 
 Ashlan Davis, Tulsa (SI-KR, PFW-KR, Rivals-KR)
 Ted Ginn Jr., Ohio State (SI-PR, PFW-PR, Rivals-PR)

See also
 2004 All-Big Ten Conference football team
 2004 All-Big 12 Conference football team
 2004 All-SEC football team

External links

 2004 Associated Press All-American Team
 2004 AFCA All-American Team
 2004 FWAA All-American Team
 2004 Sporting News All-American Team
 2004 Sports Illustrated All-American Team 

  2004 Pro Football Weekly All-American Team
  2004 ESPN All-American Team
 2004 CBS Sports.com All-American Team
 2004 College Football News All-American Team
 2004 Rivals.com All-American Team 
  2007 NCAA Record Book

All-America Team
College Football All-America Teams